The 1936 United States presidential election in California was held on November 3, 1936, as part of the 1936 United States presidential election. State voters chose twenty-two electors, or representatives to the Electoral College, who voted for president and vice president.

California voted for the Democratic candidate, incumbent President Franklin D. Roosevelt of New York, in a landslide over the Republican challenger, Kansas Governor Alfred Mossman Landon, carrying every county and nearly sixty-seven percent of the vote to Landon’s 31.7%. Roosevelt’s percentage of the vote is the highest of any presidential candidate in California history, besting Warren G. Harding’s 66.2% in 1920. While his 35.25-percentage point margin of victory over Landon is the largest for any Democratic candidate, it is the second largest overall behind Harding’s 41.92% in 1920 and ahead of Theodore Roosevelt’s 34.9% in 1904.

, this is the last time that a presidential candidate from either political party completely swept all of California’s counties in an election. The only other candidate to manage this has been Harding in his landslide 1920 victory.

Roosevelt was the last Democrat until Hillary Clinton in 2016 to carry Orange County in a presidential election, and the last until John Kerry in 2004 to carry Alpine County. Also, this was the only one of FDR’s four presidential campaigns where he carried Riverside County, which had never previously voted Democratic since its first election in 1896 and would not do so again until Lyndon B. Johnson in 1964.

Results

Results by county

References

1936 California elections
California
1936